Semeltinden is a mountain in Lom Municipality in Innlandet county, Norway. The mountain is surrounded by several other notable mountains including Hinnotefjellet and Reinstinden to the east; Storådalshøi and Høgtunga to the southeast; Skarddalseggi and Store Rauddalseggi to the southwest; Høgvagltindene to the west; Visbretinden, Semelholstinden, Langvasshøi, and Urdadalstindene to the northwest; and Søre Hellstugutinden, Nestsøre Hellstugutinden, and Store Hellstugutinden to the northeast.

See also
List of mountains of Norway by height

References

Jotunheimen
Lom, Norway
Mountains of Innlandet